Evangelisches Gesangbuch (EG; ,  "Protestant song book") is the current hymnal of German-language congregations in Germany, Alsace and Lorraine, Austria, and Luxembourg, which was introduced from 1993 and 1996, succeeding the Evangelisches Kirchengesangbuch (EKG). Evangelisches Gesangbuch appears in 14 different regional editions, which add regional hymns to the 535 hymns common for all editions.

More generally, Evangelisches Gesangbuch was the name of many Protestant hymnals in history.

Literature 

 Gerhard Hahn, Jürgen Henkys (ed.): Liederkunde zum evangelischen Gesangbuch. Vandenhoeck & Ruprecht, Göttingen 2000–2019
 Wolfgang Herbst (ed.): Komponisten und Liederdichter des evangelischen Gesangbuchs. Vandenhoeck & Ruprecht, Göttingen 1999, 
 Ernst Lippold, Günter Vogelsang: Konkordanz zum Evangelischen Gesangbuch mit Verzeichnis der Strophenanfänge, Kanons, mehrstimmigen Sätze und Wochenlieder. Vandenhoeck & Ruprecht, Göttingen 1995, 
 Matthias Neufeld: Das Bild der Kirche im Singen der Gemeinde. Überlegungen zur Bedeutung des gesungenen Wortes für das Selbstverständnis der Kirche anhand ausgewählter Lieder des „Evangelischen Gesangbuchs“. Rombach, Freiburg 2005,  (online)
 Karl Christian Thust: Bibliografie über die Lieder des Evangelischen Gesangbuchs. Vandenhoeck & Ruprecht, Göttingen 2006,

External links 

 Lieder und Gesänge des Evangelischen Gesangbuchs (EG)
 Gesangbuch Online = Evangelisches Gesangbuch und Gotteslob (Lieder der evangelischen und katholischen Kirche) mit Liednummer, Titel und Autor dieser christlichen Lieder. database of German hymnals, search by author and titles
 Liederbuch: Ev. Gesangbuch Christliche Liederdatenbank

Lutheran hymnals
German church music